Kennedy may refer to:

People
 John F. Kennedy (1917–1963), 35th president of the United States
 John Kennedy (Louisiana politician), (born 1951), US Senator from Louisiana
 Kennedy (surname), a family name (including a list of persons with the surname)
 Kennedy (given name), a given name (including a list of person with the first name)
 Kennedy (commentator) (born 1972), former MTV VJ Lisa Kennedy Montgomery, who uses "Kennedy" as a stage name
 Ken Anderson (wrestler) (born 1976), American professional wrestler and actor formerly known as Mr. Kennedy

Families
 Kennedy family, members of which have held high political US office
 Kennedy (Ireland), or O'Kennedy, a royal dynasty
 Clan Kennedy, of Scotland

Fictional characters
 Leon S. Kennedy, a fictional character in Resident Evil
 Kennedy (Buffy the Vampire Slayer), a fictional character in Buffy the Vampire Slayer

Places

Australia 

Kennedy, Queensland, a locality in the Cassowary Coast Region, Queensland, Australia
Division of Kennedy, a Federal electoral district in Queensland, Australia
Electoral district of Kennedy, a former State electoral district in Queensland, Australia

Brazil 

Presidente Kennedy, Espírito Santo, a municipality in Brazil
Presidente Kennedy, Tocantins, a municipality in Brazil

Canada 

Kennedy, Ontario
Kennedy (TTC), a subway station located in Toronto, Ontario
Kennedy GO Station, a GO Transit station in Toronto, Ontario
Kennedy, Saskatchewan
Kennedys, Ontario, a community within the township of Strong, Ontario
Kennedy Channel, a sea passage between Canada and Greenland

China 

Kennedy Town, Hong Kong
Kennedy Town station, a Mass Transit Railway terminus in Kennedy Town, Hong Kong

Colombia 

 Kennedy, Bogotá, Colombia

Lebanon 

 Rue John Kennedy, a street in Beirut, Lebanon

Luxembourg 

 Avenue John F. Kennedy

Solomon Islands 

 Kennedy Island, Solomon Islands

United States 

 Kennedy, Alabama
 Kennedy, California
 Kennedy, Illinois
 Kennedy, Indiana
 Kennedy, Minnesota
 Kennedy, Missouri
 Kennedy, Nebraska
 Kennedy, New York
 John F. Kennedy International Airport, Queens, New York
 Kennedy, Wisconsin
 Kennedy Plaza, Providence, Rhode Island
 Kennedy Township, Allegheny County, Pennsylvania
 Kennedy Space Center, Cape Canaveral, Florida

Other places

 Kennedy Lake (disambiguation)
 Kennedy Road (disambiguation)
 List of peaks named Kennedy

Television
 Kennedy (TV series), an Irish television chat show
 Kennedy (miniseries), a TV miniseries about the life of President Kennedy from 1961 to 1963
 The Kennedys (miniseries), a TV miniseries chronicling the lives of the Kennedy family
 The Kennedys (TV series), a British sitcom

Organizations
 Kathryn Kennedy Winery, a winery in California, US
 Kennedy Mall, in Dubuque, Iowa, US
 Kennedy Mine, in Jackson, California, US
 Kennedy's, a defunct department store in the US
 Kennedy Middle School (disambiguation)

Court cases 

 Kennedy v. Mendoza-Martinez, a 1963 U.S.Supreme Court case
 Kennedy v. Louisiana, a 2008 U.S.Supreme Court case
 Kennedy v. Bremerton School District, a 2022 U.S. Supreme Court case

Other uses
 Kennedy's disease, neuromuscular disease
 Kennedy Doctrine, U.S. policy towards Latin America in the early 1960s
 Kennedy march, a 50-mile-walk completed within 20 hours
 Kennedy Round, international trade negotiations held during the mid-1960s
 USS Kennedy, any of several U.S. naval vessels
 Kennedy (horse)

See also
 John F. Kennedy High School (disambiguation)
 Justice Kennedy (disambiguation)
 Kenedy (disambiguation)
 Harrison H. Kennedy Award, an American high school sports award
 Kennedy Award (journalism), an Australian award for journalism